Nowell-Mayerburg-Oliver House is a historic home located at Selma, Johnston County, North Carolina.  It was built about 1912, and is a two-story, 2 1/2-bay, square, Queen Anne style frame dwelling.  It features gabled projecting bays, a three-story octagonal stair tower, second story Palladian window, and a wrap-around porch with elegant Ionic order columns.  Also on the property are the contributing garage and a small bungalow style summer house.

It was listed on the National Register of Historic Places in 1982. It is located in the West Selma Historic District.

References

Houses on the National Register of Historic Places in North Carolina
Queen Anne architecture in North Carolina
Houses completed in 1912
Houses in Johnston County, North Carolina
National Register of Historic Places in Johnston County, North Carolina
1912 establishments in North Carolina
Historic district contributing properties in North Carolina